Suzhou Sports Center is a multi-use stadium in Suzhou, China.  It is currently used mostly for soccer matches. The stadium holds 35,000 people.

References

Football venues in China
Sports venues in Suzhou
Buildings and structures completed in 2002